Tillodontia is an extinct suborder of eutherian mammals known from the Early Paleocene to Late Eocene of China, the Late Paleocene to Middle Eocene of North America where they display their maximum species diversity, the Middle Eocene of Pakistan, and the Early Eocene of Europe. Leaving no descendants, they are most closely related to the pantodonts, another extinct group. The tillodonts were medium- to large-sized animals that probably feed on roots and tubers in temperate to subtropical habitats.

Description
Tillodonts had rodent-like incisors, clawed feet and blunt, cusped teeth. They were mostly medium-sized animals, although the largest of them (such as Trogosus) could reach the size of a large bear.

The second upper and lower incisors are large in most species, the first upper and lower premolars are small or absent, the fourth upper and lower premolars are molariform (molar-like).

When Marsh first named and described the tillodonts, he explained:

When naming his new "pachyderm" species Trogosus castoridens ("beaver-toothed gnawing-hog"), Leidy added that it was a fossil "which would appear to have pertained to the stock from which diverged the Rhinoceros and Mastodon, the Peccary, and perhaps the Beaver."

Classification
Franchaius from the early Eocene of Europe, Benaius, Lofochaius, Meiostylodon, and Huananius from the early Paleocene of China, and Yuesthonyx from the late Paleocene of China are primitive forms. Interogale from the late Paleocene of China, and Anchilestes probably from the middle Paleocene of China, were once assigned to Anagalida, but may also be primitive tillodonts.

The monophyly of the subfamily Trogosinae is unchallenged, but Esthonychines most likely includes the ancestors of Trogosinae and therefore is probably paraphyletic. Tillodontia is mostly known from dentaries and teeth. The cranium is best known from Trogosinae and the postcranium from Trogosus.

Azygonyx and Esthonyx from North America, Franchaius and Plesiesthonyx from Europe, and Basalina from Pakistan are all morphologically closely related but obviously geographically quite widespread. In contrast, Asian tillodonts tend to be smaller and less derived. This possible link between specimens from Pakistan and Europe with those from North America adds evidence to a faunal interchange between these continents during the early Eocene.

Suborder Tillodontia
 Genus †Azygonyx, dentary, postcranial fragments
 Genus †Basalina, poorly preserved jaw fragment with incomplete cheek tooth 
 Genus †Benaius, left lower jaw
 Genus †Dysnoetodon, maxilla and lower jaw
 Family †Esthonychidae (Syn. Anchippodontidae, Tillotheriidae)
 Genus †Adapidium, right lower jaw
 Subfamily †Esthonychinae
 Genus †Esthonyx, lower mandibles, teeth
 Genus †Megalesthonyx, left mandible, teeth, feet bones
 Subfamily †Trogosinae (Syn. Anchippodus)
 Genus †Tillodon, skull
 Genus †Trogosus (Syn. Tillotherium), skull, lower jaws, teeth, vertebrae, ilium, limb bones, feet bones
 Genus †Franchaius (synonymized with Plesiesthonyx), less than 20 isolated teeth
 Genus †Higotherium, fragmentary right mandible, teeth
 Genus †Interogale, well-preserved mandible
 Genus †Kuanchuanius, partial mandible, teeth
 Genus †Lofochaius, poorly preserved skull with few teeth
 Genus †Meiostylodon, three isolated teeth
 Genus †Plesiesthonyx, isolated molars
 Genus †Plethorodon, partial skull with upper cheek teeth
 Genus †Simplodon, right upper jaw with cheek teeth
 Family †Yuesthonychidae
 Genus †Yuesthonyx, left mandibles, partial skull, teeth

Notes

References

 
 
 
 
 
 
 
 
 
 
 
 
 
 
 
 
 
 
 
 
 
 
 
 
 
 

 
Eocene mammals
Paleocene mammals
Clawed herbivores
Taxa named by Othniel Charles Marsh
Paleocene first appearances
Eocene extinctions
Fossil taxa described in 1875
Mammal suborders
Prehistoric animal suborders